Inamura is a Japanese surname. Notable people with the surname include:

, Japanese gravure idol, television personality and sportscaster
, Japanese politician
, Japanese cyclist
, Japanese photographer
, Japanese voice actress

Japanese-language surnames